Michael Shields may refer to:

 Michael Shields (footballer) (born 1986), Cork Gaelic football star
 Michael W. Shields, British computer scientist
 Michael Shields, body snatcher as part of a group called the London Burkers
 Michael Shields, Liverpool football fan convicted of attempted murder in Bulgaria, see Conviction of Michael Shields

See also
 Mick Shields (1912–1983), Australian rugby league footballer
 Michael Patrick Shiels, radio host